Tell Touqan (also spelled Tell Toqan or Tall Tukan) is a village in northwestern Syria, administratively part of the Idlib Governorate, located about 45 kilometers southwest of Aleppo. Nearby localities include Tell Sultan and Tell Kalbah to the east, Abu al-Thuhur to the southeast, Shaykh Idris to the southwest, Kafr Amim to the west, Saraqib to the northwest and Jazraya to the north. According to the Syria Central Bureau of Statistics (CBS), Tell Touqan had a population of 3,531 in the 2004 census.

History
The village of Tell Touqan is built atop a large tell ("artificial mound"). The mound has an area of about 27 hectares, encircled by the remains of a tall wall as well as an inner wall within the perimeter and gaps in between the walls. This suggests the previous existence of a citadel with gates. The ruins of an acropolis are also located on the mound. It has been suggested that Tell Touqan corresponds with Thaknu in Egyptian pharaoh Thutmose III's list of settlements and the Tukhan of Assyrian emperor Tiglath-pileser II's list. The site, situated 15 kilometers north-west of the Dead City of Ebla, has been identified with the Bronze Age city of "Ursa'um" which served as a major regional center in the 24th century BCE. More comprehensive research suggests Ursa'um to be closer to Gaziantep in Turkey. A number of archaeology experts have said Tell Touqan's identification with Ursa'um is not possible. It was destroyed by the Assyrians around the same time as Ebla, but was later rebuilt after Ebla's reestablishment.

Early Bronze
In the EBIVB, Tell Touqan was occupied.

Middle Bronze
In the MBI, there are no evidence of occupation.
In MBIIA, Phase 3 belongs to the early part while Phase 2A-B (c. 1800-1700/1650 BC) belongs to the later.
In early MBIIB, the occupation may have ended.

Iron Age
In the Iron Age, Phase 1 dated to around 720-535 BC.

Modern History
Tell Touqan was named after Abdullah Touqan, a regional sheikh ("chief") of the Al Touqan tribe. The Al Touqan were Arab Muslim nomadic tribes who dominated northern Syria prior to the 18th-century. Before it gained its current name, the village was called Tell al-Dahab which translates as the "Golden Mound."

In the late 19th and early 20th centuries Tell Touqan was a feudal (musha) village. In the mid-1950s only seven of the village's 56 families were landowners. The remaining 49 families were either employed as farm workers or sharecroppers. About 19 feddans were owned by the founder of Tell Touqan and his descendants, ten were owned by a tribal chief, Shaykh Nuri, who settled in the village, and the remaining seven feddans were owned by four other residents. The feudalism of Tell Touqan was not deep-rooted and most of the land was assigned to its owners by the Ottoman government. Following the consolidation of socialist Baath Party rule in Syria the system ended.

References

Bibliography

Populated places in Idlib District